Chipping Campden School is a non-selective secondary school and sixth form with academy status located in Chipping Campden, in the English county of Gloucestershire. Founded in c1440 the school celebrated its 575th birthday in 2015.

The school was founded with money left by John Fereby and his wife, a wealthy wool merchant, for the education of the poor boys of the town. Further investments were provided by Baptist Hicks, 1st Viscount Campden and later the Earl of Gainsborough in the 17th century and John Townsend. The school now uses these founders as its house names.

The original school buildings were situated in the High Street in Chipping Campden offering boarding for boys and later girls in other local buildings.

The school came to be a grammar school until 1965 when it merged with Moreton Secondary Modern School to become a comprehensive. The school buildings were substantially enlarged in 1964 to house the incoming students from Moreton.

Headmasters of Chipping Campden Grammar School (up to 1964)
 1547 Sir Robert Glaseman
 1627 Rev Ambrose Jenks
 1632 Rev Broadway
 1635 Rev Samuel Edwards
 1647 Rev Butler
 1648 Rev Mason MA
 1664 Rev Kirkham
 1669 Rev Taylor
 1686 Rev Morse
 1700 Rev Smith
 1717 Rev R Goodhall
 1741 Rev Lumbert
 1766 Rev W Boyce
 1772 Rev T Symonds
 1797 Rev J Worgan
 1822 Rev R O Wilson
 1832 Rev J Harling
 1835 Rev T F Layng
 1837 Rev H Miniken
 1840- Rev Barton
 1855 Rev G B Dodwell
 1862 Rev Dr S F Hiron
 1871 Rev J Foster
 1889 Mr F B Osborne
 1913 Mr W M Cox MA
 1927 Mr W J Bright MA
 1951 Mr A L Jones MC MA

Headteachers of Chipping Campden School 
 1965 Mr A L Jones MC MA
 1976 Mr P T Sandry MA MEd
 1994 Mr J Price BA
 2007 Ms A France MSc MEd

Principals of Chipping Campden School
 2011 Ms A France MSc MEd
 2012 Mr J Sanderson BA (Hons) MA

References

External links
 Chipping Campden School official website

Secondary schools in Gloucestershire
Academies in Gloucestershire
1440 establishments in England
Educational institutions established in the 15th century
Chipping Campden